Perrin is a census-designated place (CDP) and unincorporated community in southeastern Jack County, Texas, United States. As of the 2010 census it had a population of 398. It is located at the intersection of US Highway 281 and FM 2210.

It was established in 1870 and named for Levi W. Perrin, the father of the town's founder, Louis Perrin. In the early 20th century, the small town supported two banks and was larger than Jacksboro. Perrin was in prime consideration for the county seat and was only passed over for Jacksboro because it was not centrally located within the county.

US 281 leads north from Perrin  to Jacksboro and south  to Mineral Wells.

Businesses in the community include the Pirate One Stop (the town's only gas station), the US Post Office (ZIP code 76486), multiple churches, a Skid Steer dealership, a Food Truck, and the school.

The Perrin-Whitt Consolidated Independent School District serves area students including those living in the nearby community of Whitt.

Former MLB Pitcher, Doyle Alexander, lived outside of Perrin for a period of time in the late 2000’s to early 2010’s.

Bluegrass festivals

Two miles east of Perrin is Great Escapes RV Resort North Texas, formerly known as Mitchell Resort and RV Park, which was founded by the William and Frances Mitchell family. The park hosted bluegrass festivals, with the first presented in 1975.  The Mitchell Family Bluegrass Gospel Band (William and Frances, along with their five children) performed at the festivals and were nationally renowned. The festivals ended in approximately 1998 and did not begin again until 2004, under new owners. The youngest of the Mitchell family, Patty Beth, served in the early 1990s as interim bassist/mandolinist and lead vocalist for an early lineup of the Dixie Chicks.

References

External links
 Texas Handbook Online

Unincorporated communities in Texas
Census-designated places in Jack County, Texas
Census-designated places in Texas